Humberstone Speedway is a 3/8 mile dirt oval raceway located in Port Colborne, Ontario. Races are held on Sunday nights, and regular events include Mini Stocks, 4-Cylinder Trucks, Street Stocks, RUSH Late Models, and DIRT Sportsman races.

Major events
The speedway is also host to the Molson All-Canadian, an all day and all night event with extended races for each class, and the annual Eve of Destruction, an event dedicated to demolition-style racing events such as flagpole races, school bus races and blindfold races.

See also
Dirt track racing
List of dirt track ovals in Canada
Sprint car racing
Short track motor racing
Auto racing
Race track

References

External links
Humberstone Speedway

Motorsport venues in Ontario
Dirt oval racing venues in Canada
Motorsport in Canada
1957 establishments in Ontario
Port Colborne
Tourist attractions in the Regional Municipality of Niagara